Benjamin Jason Horton (September 18, 1873 – 1963) was an American politician and one-time acting governor of Puerto Rico.

Career 
Horton was a delegate to the Democratic National Convention from Puerto Rico from 1912 through 1932 and then as a member of the Democratic National Committee from 1932 to 1940.

He was the attorney general of Puerto Rico from 1933 to 1935. During that time, he also served as governor of Puerto Rico from January 1934 to February 5, 1934.

Personal life 
Horton was born in Lawrence, Kansas, in 1873. He died at a nursing home in Amherst, Massachusetts, in 1963.

References

External links
WorldStatesmen.org: Puerto Rico
Political Graveyard: Horton

1873 births
1963 deaths
Politicians from Lawrence, Kansas
Governors of Puerto Rico